Two experimental versions of the BMW M1, designed to Group 5 specification, were built by both Swiss racing team Sauber, and British constructor March, in collaboration with BMW, for sports car racing, between 1979 and 1982. It was far more developed and heavily modified compared to the BMW M1 Procars, which were built to the FIA Group 4 regulations.

References

External links

BMW racing cars
March vehicles
Grand tourer racing cars
Sauber Motorsport